nLayers is a company specializing in network discovery products; software designed to map the entirety of hosts, services, etc. that run on a given organization's network.  Its primary product is "nLayers InSight".

History
nLayers was founded by Gili Raanan, in 2003 and is headquartered in Cupertino, California with a research and development center in Herzliya, Israel. Initial funding was provided by Venture capital funds Gemini Israel Funds and Walden Israel.

The company was the first to introduce an agent-less technology to discover, understand and map the complex relationships between applications and the underlying technology infrastructure.

nLayers also offered one of the first real-life implementations of CMDB (Configuration Management Database) and was recognized by analysts firm Forrester as the leading CMDB product.

Since its acquisition on June 7, 2006, nLayers was a subsidiary of EMC and was later merged into Vmware. In June 2013 Vmware announced that end of life date for the original nLayers product will be 03/08/2017.

Technology

nLayers' technology expands EMC's Network Resource Management and Storage Resource Management product portfolio, enhancing their ability to conduct automated comprehensive root-cause and impact analysis across all technology domains - including networks, applications and storage.

See also
 EMC Corporation 
 Silicon Wadi

References

External links
 Walden Israel Venture Capital
 Gemini Israel Funds

Companies based in Cupertino, California
Dell EMC
Companies established in 2003
Software companies of Israel